Peter Wilcox Jones (born 1952) is a mathematician at Yale University, known for his work in harmonic analysis and fractal geometry.  He received his Ph.D. at the University of California, Los Angeles in 1978, under the supervision of John B. Garnett.  He received the Salem Prize in 1981. He is an elected member of the U.S. National Academy of Sciences (2008), the Royal Swedish Academy of Sciences (2008), and the American Academy of Arts and Sciences (1998). He is not related to the mathematician Vaughan Jones.

References

External links
 Faculty page at Yale
 

1952 births
Living people
20th-century American mathematicians
21st-century American mathematicians
University of California, Los Angeles alumni
Yale University faculty
Members of the United States National Academy of Sciences